Aalohari Anandam (Per Capita Happiness) is a Malayalam-language novel by Sarah Joseph published in 2013. The novel was originally serialised in Mathrubhumi Weekly.

Plot summary
Set in a large Christian household, Aalohari Anandam dissects different faces of man-woman relationships, as well as sexual orientation. Its story deals with the homosexuality of a married woman and its impact in her life and society.

Release
The novel was released at a function at the Kerala Sahitya Akademi in Thrissur on 26 December 2013. Writer M. Mukundan handed over the first copy of the book to literary critic S. Saradakutty. The Novel Market Price is Rs. 500.00.

References

2013 Indian novels
Malayalam novels
Novels set in Kerala
Novels with lesbian themes
2010s LGBT novels
Novels by Sarah Joseph
2013 LGBT-related literary works